Toboggan (1925 – 1944) was a British Thoroughbred racehorse and broodmare. She showed very promising form as a juvenile in 1928 when she won three of her four races including the Dewhurst Stakes. In the following year she finished third in the 1000 Guineas and went on to win the Epsom Oaks, Coronation Stakes and Jockey Club Stakes. She had some success as a broodmare producing the top-class winner Bobsleigh and Hydroplane, the dam of Citation.

Background
Toboggan was a bay mare bred in the United Kingdom by her owner Edward Stanley, 17th Earl of Derby. She was sent into training with Frank Butters at his Fitzroy House stable in Newmarket, Suffolk. She was ridden in most of her races by Tommy Weston.

She was from the seventh crop of foals sired by the unbeaten champion, Hurry On, making her a representative of the Godolphin Arabian sire line. Apart from Toboggan, Hurry On sired numerous major winners including Captain Cuttle, Coronach, Call Boy, Precipitation and Pennycomequick. Toboggan's dam Glacier was a half-sister to Canyon who won the 1000 Guineas and was the dam of Colorado.

Racing career

1927: two-year-old season
As a two-year-old in 1927 Toboggan finished third in a maiden race at Kempton Park Racecourse on her debut and then won the Champion Breeders Foal Plate at Derby Racecourse. In autumn at Newmarket Racecourse Toboggan was matched against male opposition won the Boscawen Plate. In the Dewhurst Stakes over seven furlongs at the same track she won again and won at odds of 4/9 despite carrying a seven pound weight penalty.

Toboggan ended the season with earnings of £3,528.

1928: three-year-old season

On 4 of May Toboggan contested the 1000 Guineas over the Rowley Mile course at Newmarket. She finished third of the fourteen runners behind the King's filly Scuttle, who started the 15/8 favourite. At Epsom Racecourse on 8 of June Toboggan faced Scuttle again in the 150th edition of the Oaks Stakes and started at odds of 100/15 (approximately 6.7/1) in a thirteen-runner field. Toboggan took the lead at least six furlongs from the finish, steadily increased her advantage in the straight and came home four lengths clear of Scuttle with a gap of six lengths back to Flegere in third place.

Toboggan was dropped back in distance for the Coronation Stakes at Royal Ascot. Starting at odds of 11/10 she won from Scuttle and Romany Queen. On 4 October Toboggan was matched against older horse in the Jockey Club Stakes over fourteen furlongs at Newmarket. She won by two lengths from four-year-old colt Bonny Bay at odds of 3/1. At the end of the season Lord Derby explained that both Toboggan and his leading colt Fairway had been successfully subjected to a process of "electric light treatment".

In the 1928 season, Toboggan won £21,522.

Assessment and honours
In their book, A Century of Champions, based on the Timeform rating system, John Randall and Tony Morris rated Toboggan a "superior" winner of the Oaks and the best filly of her generation trained in Britain or Ireland.

Breeding record
At the end of her racing career Toboggan was retired to become a broodmare for Lord Derby's stud. She produced at least eight foals between 1930 and 1941:

Moccasin, a filly, foaled in 1930, sired by Phalaris
Bobsleigh, chestnut colt, 1932, by Gainsborough. Won Richmond Stakes and Newmarket Stakes.
Pendola, filly, 1933, by Felstead
Colours Flying, bay filly, 1934, by Gainsborough
Mont Angel, colt, 1937, by Fairway
Hydroplane, chestnut filly, 1938, by Hyperion. Dam of Citation.
Evenlode, bay filly, 1939, by Hyperion
Winter Sport, bay filly, 1941, by Hyperion

Toboggan produced no live foals after 1941 and was euthanised in 1944.

Pedigree

References

1925 racehorse births
1944 racehorse deaths
Racehorses bred in the United Kingdom
Racehorses trained in the United Kingdom
Thoroughbred family 3-l
Epsom Oaks winners
Godolphin Arabian sire line